Chaqa Bahram (also Romanized as Chaqā Bahrām, Cheqā bahrām, Choghā Bahrām, Choghā Bahrām, and Choqā Bahrām; also known as Bahārābād) is a village in Zhan Rural District, in the Central District of Dorud County, Lorestan Province, Iran. At the 2006 census, its population was 319, in 75 families.

References 

Towns and villages in Dorud County